Juan Martín-Merbilháa (11 December 1925 – 28 May 1972) was an Argentine equestrian. He competed in two events at the 1956 Summer Olympics.

References

External links
 

1925 births
1972 deaths
Argentine male equestrians
Olympic equestrians of Argentina
Equestrians at the 1956 Summer Olympics
Place of birth missing